Color Rush is a South Korean mystery romance web series starring Yoo Jun and Hyun Jun. Based on the eponymous Boys' love novel; it tells the story of Yeon Woo, played by Yoo, who can only see the world in varying tones of gray and Yoo Han, played by Hur, with whom Yeon Woo experiences a "color rush" – suddenly being able to see colour. It premiered in South Korea on Seezn, Wavve, Naver Series on and Skylife VOD and outside South Korea on Viki, Viu and Line TV on December 30, 2020, and concluded on January 21, 2021. On October 28, 2021, it was confirmed for a second season.

Season 1 
Yeon Woo is a monochrome person also known as 'Mono' who sees the world only through different shades of gray, white and black due to his total color blindness (achromatopsia), he is aware that other colors exist but has never experienced them for himself, nor did he care to do so. However, each "Mono" has a fated person known as a "Probe", Yeon Woo's life changes forever when he meets Yoo Han, his destined lover, and experiences his first "color rush",  a phenomenon that causes suddenly see colors through intense experiences. Terrified that he would be obsessed with Yoo Han due to Yoo Han's ability to make him see colors, Yeon Woo tries to avoid Yoo Han, but why does Yoo Han insist on approaching him? While all this is happening his aunt Yi Rang searches for her sister who went missing days ago.

Season 2 
Choi Yeon Woo is a high school student and a "mono", a person who sees the world through different shades of gray, white, dull and lifeless black. But for each mono there is a "probe", a kind of soulmate that allows the mono to see the world in vivid colors. Yeon Woo's probe was a boy named Yoo Han, and the two developed a beautiful friendship that blossomed into romance. But as their relationship intensified, mysterious events unfolded that suddenly became very unpleasant for Yeon Woo, who eventually found out that Yoo Han was also missing. Yeon Woo vows to do whatever it takes to locate his "probe" and his mother as well. A classmate named Se Hyun learns of Yeon Woo's search and decides to help and protect him, while a close friendship develops between the two students. But Se Hyun is hiding a secret and Yeon Woo may be about to find out the truth...

Meanwhile, Yeon Woo is not alone: other mono's are closer than he thinks, including a female mono who is also searching for her own probe and a TV producer is also on the scene, hoping to get to the bottom of the mystery of the probe and the mono.

Casts 
 Hur Hyun-jun as Go Yoohan
 Yoo Jun as Choi Yeonwoo
 Hyuk as Kim Sehyun

Original soundtrack
The soundtrack of the first season of the series was released on January 8, 2021.

References

External links
 
 

South Korean drama web series
2020 web series debuts
South Korean LGBT-related television shows
Viki (streaming service) original programming
2020s LGBT-related drama television series
LGBT-related animated series
South Korean boys' love television series